Hadley is a town in Hampshire County, Massachusetts, United States. The population was 5,325 at the 2020 census. It is part of the Springfield, Massachusetts Metropolitan Statistical Area. The area around the Hampshire and Mountain Farms Malls along Route 9 is a major shopping destination for the surrounding communities.

History

Early
Hadley was first settled in 1659 and was officially incorporated in 1661. The former Norwottuck was renamed for Hadleigh, Suffolk. Its settlers were primarily a discontented group of families from the Puritan colonies of Hartford and Wethersfield, Connecticut, who petitioned to start a new colony up north after some controversy over doctrine in the local church. The settlement was led by John Russell. The first settler inside of Hadley was Nathaniel Dickinson, who surveyed the streets of what is now Hadley, Hatfield, and Amherst. At the time, Hadley encompassed a wide radius of land on both sides of the Connecticut River (but mostly on the eastern shore) including much of what would become known as the Equivalent Lands. In the following century, these were broken off into precincts and eventually the separate towns of Hatfield, Amherst, South Hadley, Granby and Belchertown. The early histories of these towns are, as a result, filed under the history of Hadley.

Lt. Gen. Edward Whalley and Maj. Gen. William Goffe, two Puritan generals hunted for their role in the execution (or "regicide") of Charles I of England, were hidden in the home of the town's minister, John Russell. During King Philip's War, an attack by Native Americans was, by some accounts, thwarted with the aid of General Goffe. This event, compounded by the reluctance of the townsfolk to betray Goffe's location, developed into the legend of the Angel of Hadley, which came to be included in the historical manuscript History of Hadley by Sylvester Judd.

In 1683, eleven years before the Salem witch trials, Mary Webster, wife to William Webster son of the former governor of Connecticut and a founder of the very town of Hadley (John Webster), was accused and acquitted of witchcraft. She was unsuccessfully hanged by rowdy town folk. A description is given in Cotton Mather's Magnalia Christi Americana.

The Civil War general Joseph Hooker was a longtime resident of Hadley. Levi Stockbridge, one of the founders of the Massachusetts Agricultural College (now the University of Massachusetts Amherst), was also from Hadley where he was a farmer.

Recent 
Hadley's transformation from an old agricultural order to the new form is the direct result of expansion of the nearby University of Massachusetts Amherst during the 1960s. Much of its former farmland was swallowed in the housing market stimulated by incoming faculty and off-campus students. Route 116 was redirected in an attempt to solve traffic congestion. Route 9, which runs east–west through the town to connect Amherst and Northampton, became a hotpoint for commercial development due to Amherst not wanting development on its land, and large corporations such as Stop & Shop and McDonald's opened stores along the strip. Today, the Hadley economy is a mixture of agriculture and commercial development, including big-box stores and the Hampshire Mall. Current big-box retail includes a Wal-Mart, a Target, a Home Depot, and a Lowe's, plus more than a dozen other stores.

In 2003, an organization called Hadley Neighbors for Sensible Development was formed that opposed continued large-scale commercial development in Hadley by emphasizing the downside of such growth. However, many local residents support commercial development, and about 1,000 people signed a petition asking for a new Wal-Mart, saying it would save them money on their groceries. In 2008, Wal-Mart pulled its plans to build the Supercenter after the Conservation Commission ruled that the plan did not comply with wetlands regulations. The developer of the site (Hampshire Mall) filed and lost numerous appeals but continued its legal challenges of the commission's findings. Many residents also opposed rezoning to accommodate a new Lowe's store because they said it would be too big and would require more filling of wetlands than allowed by state law. However, the rezoning passed in 2004 and the store was built in 2009. Lowe's then sued the town because it didn't want to pay the required sewer hookup fees. And, in 2010, the Massachusetts Department of Environmental Protection found that Lowe's had illegally filled large areas of wetlands on that site and fined the developer more than $15,000.

The World Monuments Fund listed the "Cultural Landscape of Hadley, Massachusetts" on the 2010 World Monuments Watch List of Most Endangered Sites.

The landscape of Hadley is largely open-field farming, which was only used in the earliest New England settlements and had mostly disappeared by the 18th century; its survival in Hadley on such a large scale is unusual. According to the World Monument Fund  are zoned for residential and commercial use, providing no long-term protection for the historic landscape.

Economy
Hadley's economy can be in large part characterized by agriculture and retail services, having the thoroughfare Massachusetts Route 9 traversing it east to west with abundant stores, and a wide variety of farms which benefit from the area's Hadley loam. Due to its climate and soils, one of its staple crops for the last two centuries has consistently been its asparagus, which has been described as competing in Boston markets despite local availability of the crop from other nearby regions, as well as in restaurants in France and Germany, and Queen Elizabeth II's own annual spring feast in England. Its ubiquity and reputation in Hadley agriculture has lent it the nickname "Hadley grass".

Education

Hadley is home to Hadley Elementary School serving children in kindergarten through sixth grade, and Hopkins Academy, serving grades seven through twelve. Hopkins Academy was founded in 1664 through money that was donated by Edward Hopkins, a wealthy Connecticut merchant, and it is the fourth oldest public high school in the United States. Hadley is also home to the Pioneer Valley Chinese Immersion Charter School.

Geography

The land boundaries of Hadley are Sunderland to the north, Amherst to the east, and South Hadley to the south. The Mount Holyoke Range forms the boundary with South Hadley and is where the highest point of Hadley is found. The Metacomet-Monadnock Trail traverses the Holyoke Range with panoramic vistas from several locations.

Climate

In a typical year, Hadley, Massachusetts temperatures fall below 50F° for 205 days per year. Annual precipitation is typically 44.7 inches per year (high in the US) and snow covers the ground 66 days per year or 18.1% of the year (high in the US). It may be helpful to understand the yearly precipitation by imagining 9 straight days of moderate rain per year. The humidity is below 60% for approximately 18.4 days or 5% of the year.

Demographics

As of the census of 2000, there were 4,793 people, 1,895 households, and 1,248 families residing in the town. The racial makeup of the town was 95.91% White, 0.75% African American, 0.6% Native American, 1.56% Asian, 0.58% from other races, and 1.13% from two or more races. Hispanic or Latino of any race were 1.67% of the population.

There were 1,895 households, out of which 26.6% had children under the age of 18 living with them, 53.1% were married couples living together, 9.8% had a female householder with no husband present, and 34.1% were non-families. 24.7% of all households were made up of individuals, and 12.2% had someone living alone who was 65 years of age or older. The average household size was 2.45 and the average family size was 2.90.

The population was spread out, with 20.0% under the age of 18, 7.0% from 18 to 24, 27.7% from 25 to 44, 25.7% from 45 to 64, and 19.5% who were 65 years of age or older. The median age was 42 years. For every 100 females, there were 88.5 males. For every 100 females age 18 and over, there were 87.4 males.

The median income for a household in the town was $51,851, and the median income for a family was $61,897. Males had a median income of $44,773 versus $34,189 for females. The per capita income for the town was $24,945. About 4.8% of families and 6.9% of the population were below the poverty line, including 6.6% of those under age 18 and 3.2% of those age 65 or over.

Government 

Hadley is governed by open Town Meeting, a form of government most common to New England.   The Board of Selectmen consists of five members and is elected annually on the second Tuesday in April.   There is a Town Administrator as well. The Town Meeting takes place the first Thursday in May.

Select Board 

Joyce A. Chunglo, Member – Term Expires 2024
First Elected to Select Board 2003

David J. Fill II, Chair – Term Expires 2022
First Elected to Select Board – 2018

Jane Nevinsmith, Clerk – Term Expires 2023
First Elected to Select Board – 2020

Amy Parsons – Term Expires 2024
First Elected to Select Board – 2021

John C. Waskiewicz II, Member – Term Expires 2022 
First Elected to Select Board – 2013

Town Administrator 
Carolyn Brennan 2019–Present

Points of interest

 Porter-Phelps-Huntington Museum
 Skinner State Park and Historic Summit House
 Hopkins Academy (4th oldest school in the United States; currently Hadley's public middle and high school)
 Hadley Farm Museum
 Hadley Town Common 
 Regicides monument commemorating the site where Rev. John Russell sheltered Edward Whalley and William Goffe in his home
 Warren McGuirk Alumni Stadium, the University of Massachusetts Amherst football stadium
Norwottuck Branch Rail Trail (bike path which can be traveled from Northampton, MA to Belchertown, MA; the path runs through Hadley) 
Connecticut River (the longest river in New England) 
Silvio O. Conte National Fish and Wildlife Refuge (the only refuge of its kind to encompass an entire watershed). The Fort River Birding and Nature Trail, Fort River Division in Hadley, MA features a storybook trail along a 1.1 mile fully accessible loop that can be enjoyed by walkers, parents with strollers or people who use wheelchairs.

Notable people

 William Goffe, English parliamentarian and regicide
 Lisa Green, Distinguished University Professor of Linguistics at the University of Massachusetts Amherst
 Thomas Hannum, Band director at UMass Amherst with the Minuteman Marching Band. Percussion instructor and director with Carolina Crown. Member of the Drum Corps International Hall of Fame
 Sara Northrup Hollister, occultist
 Joseph Hooker, Civil War general
 Clifton Johnson, American writer, illustrator and photographer 
 Elizabeth Porter Phelps, early American diarist
 Levi Stockbridge, Farmer and Scientist. Helped found Massachusetts Agricultural College (now known as the University of Massachusetts –Amherst) and served as first Professor of Agricultural at the school. Also served as Farm Superintendent and President
 John Webster, governor of the Colony of Connecticut (1656–1657)
 Mary Webster, accused of witchcraft, later survived an attempted lynching
 Edward Whalley, English parliamentarian and regicide

See also
 Tofu Curtain

References

Further reading
  Cultivating a Past: Essays on the History of Hadley, Massachusetts, ed. Marla R. Miller (Amherst: University of Massachusetts Press, 2009).

External links

Town of Hadley Official website

 
1661 establishments in Massachusetts
Massachusetts populated places on the Connecticut River
Springfield metropolitan area, Massachusetts
Towns in Hampshire County, Massachusetts
Towns in Massachusetts